Almiruete is a hamlet located in the municipality of Tamajón, in Guadalajara province, Castilla–La Mancha, Spain. As of 2020, it has a population of 13.

Geography 
Almiruete is located 54km north of Guadalajara, Spain.

References

Populated places in the Province of Guadalajara